Scythris fuscoaenea is a moth of the family Scythrididae found in Europe.

Description
Larvae feed on common rock-rose (Helianthemum nummularium), living within a silken tube or tent, on or below the plant.

References

fuscoaenea
Moths of Europe
Moths described in 1828
Taxa named by Adrian Hardy Haworth